John Fawcett (29 August 1768 – 13 March 1837) was an English actor and playwright.

John Fawcett was the son of York, Dublin and London actor John Fawcett (d. 1793) and his wife Sarah Plaw. His interest in following his father's career were thwarted by the latter, who sent him to St Paul's School in 1776, then placed him in a London apprenticeship with a linen draper, but young John ran away at the age of eighteen and joined Charles Mates' theatrical company at Margate.  Appearing under the name of Foote, he debuted as Courtall in The Belle's Stratagem.  He then went to Tunbridge Wells, billed under his own name, and was recommended to Tate Wilkinson, whose York company Fawcett then joined, first appearing 24 May 1787.  Though viewed as having promise, he proved a minor disappointment in dramatic roles but found success in comedic parts.  On 5 May 1788, he married actress Susan Moore, who had previously been in a long-term relationship with recently-deceased fellow company member, John Mills, by whom she had several children including actress Rosamund Charles Mills, later wife of violinist John David Loder.

In 1791, he left the York circuit for Covent Garden, first appearing as Caleb in He Wou'd Be a Soldier in September, becoming a London mainstay, also appearing at Haymarket from 1794.  There, manager George Colman wrote roles specifically for him, and named him stage manager in 1799 before a dispute caused his departure in 1802, but he returned again six years later.  He also had disputes with Covent Garden manager Thomas Harris.  During off-seasons he also appeared with provincial theatres, including at Ashburne, Edinburgh, Liverpool and Richmond.

His wife Susan died in 1797, and though a rumoured engagement in 1799 to actress Biggs came to nought, he married in 1806 to another actress, Anne Gaudry, daughter of actor Joseph Gaudry.  He served as stage manager at Covent Garden from about 1818 but after the 1828 season was removed, and shortly thereafter announced his intention to leave the stage, which he did in 1830.  He retired to Botley, Hampshire, where he spearheaded a campaign to build a new church, in which he would be the first buried following his death, 13 March 1837, his will leaving his property to his widow Anne and son.  He had several children by Anne Gaudry, including Rev. John Turner Colman Fawcett (1804-1867), and Robert Henry Harris Fawcett (1805-1859) of the 18th Regiment and the Bengal Civil Service.

As his career progressed Fawcett became effective in playing a range of characters, being particularly remembered as Dr. Pangloss in The Heir at Law (1797) and Dr. Ollapod in The Poor Gentleman (1801).  He also authored several pantomimes.

References

Highfill, Philip H., Burnim, Kalman A., and Langhans, Edward A., eds. (1978), "Fawcett, John, 1768-1837, actor, singer", A Biographical Dictionary of Actors, Actresses, Musicians, Dancers, Managers & Other Stage Personnel in London, 1680-1800. 5. Southern Illinois University Press. pp. 195–204.
Highfill, Philip H., Burnim, Kalman A., and Langhans, Edward A., eds. (1978), "Fawcett, the first Mrs John the younger, Susan, née Moore, formerly called Mrs John Mills 1761?-1707, actress, singer", A Biographical Dictionary of Actors, Actresses, Musicians, Dancers, Managers & Other Stage Personnel in London, 1680-1800. 5. Southern Illinois University Press. pp. 204–205.

1768 births
1837 deaths
English dramatists and playwrights
English male stage actors
18th-century English male actors
19th-century English male actors
English male dramatists and playwrights